Howmeh Rural District is in the Central District of Kangan County, Bushehr province, Iran. At the census of 2006, its population was 733 in 180 households; there were 1,869 inhabitants in 451 households at the following census of 2011; and in the most recent census of 2016, the population of the rural district was 3,358 in 812 households. The largest of its seven villages was Barkeh-ye Chupan, with 1,235 people.

References 

Rural Districts of Bushehr Province
Populated places in Kangan County